The 2016–17 Lega Pro Divisione Unica was the third season of the unified Lega Pro division, the third highest division in the Italian football league system. The championship name, which is Divisione Unica according to the FIGC regulations, is nevertheless referred to as Lega Pro in official documents. The season marked the final year that the division would carry the Lega Pro name as it was changed back to Serie C for the 2017–18 season.

Teams 

A total of 60 teams contest the league. Clubs include 4 sides relegated from the 2015–16 Serie B season, 41 sides playing the 2015–16 Lega Pro season, and 9 sides promoted from the 2015–16 Serie D season. Also, six teams are chosen to play in the league to increase the number of teams to 60.

On 1 July 2016, 54 teams mathematically qualified to the new season. However, Martina Franca and Sporting Bellinzago did not submit their application for a licence.
On 6 July also Virtus Lanciano did not meet the requirements to apply.
On 16 July Pavia and Rimini did not submit an appeal against Covisoc's exclusion. 
On 19 July Paganese's appeal of exclusion was rejected by Covisod. However, on 3 August Paganese was readmitted to the league by TAR's decision.
On 4 August the Federal Council selected ten teams in order to fill the vacancies created: Fano (as a replacement for Sporting Bellizango), Fondi, Forlì, Lupa Roma, Melfi, Olbia, Racing Roma, Reggina, Taranto and Vibonese. On 10 August Albinoleffe was the last team to benefit from the repechage.

Stadia and locations
Note: Table lists in alphabetical order.

Group A (North & Central West)
9 teams from Tuscany, 4 teams from Lombardy, 3 teams from Lazio, 2 teams from Emilia-Romagna, 1 team from Piedmont and 1 team from Sardinia

Group B (North & Central East)
5 teams from Emilia-Romagna, 4 teams from Lombardy, 4 teams from Marche, 3 teams from Veneto, 1 team from Abruzzo, 1 team from Friuli-Venezia Giulia, 1 team from Trentino-Alto Adige and 1 team from Umbria

Group C (South)
6 teams from Apulia, 4 teams from Calabria, 4 teams from Sicily, 3 teams from Campania, 2 teams from Basilicata and 1 team from Lazio

League Tables

Group A (North & Central West)

Group B (North & Central East)

Group C (South)

Promotion play-offs

First round 

|}
1 Won by higher placed finish.

Second round 

|}
1 Won by higher placed finish.

Final Eight 
Quarterfinals on 31 May and 4 June 2017, semifinals on 13 and 14 June 2017, final on 17 June 2017.

Relegation play-outs
Play-outs on 21 and 28 May 2017, loser on aggregate is relegated. Higher placed team plays at home for second leg. If tied on aggregate, lower-placed team is relegated.

|}

Top goalscorers

Note
1Player scored 1 goal in the play-offs.
2Player scored 2 goals in the play-offs.
3Player scored 3 goals in the play-offs.

References 

Serie C seasons
3
Italy